Centre d'Esports Sabadell Futbol Club, S.A.D. is a Spanish football team based in Sabadell, a city in the province of Barcelona in the autonomous community of Catalonia. Founded in 1903, it plays in Primera División RFEF – Group 2, holding home games at Estadi de la Nova Creu Alta.

The side has competed in national leagues since 1928, gaining its first promotion to the Segunda División in 1933 and then the La Liga in 1944. Sabadell's longest spell in the top flight was from 1965 to 1972, and their most recent from 1986 to 1988. They have reached one Copa del Rey final, which they lost 3–0 to Sevilla in 1935.

By historical standards, CE Sabadell FC is the third best club in Catalonia, after FC Barcelona and RCD Espanyol.

History
In 1901, Joan Saus and a group of youngsters from the Sabadell Catalan Centre founded Centre d'Esports Sabadell, which became fully legalized on 5 June 1906. The club's first games were held in a grass field at Prat de Sant Oleguer but, on 3 June of that year, a stadium in the Creu Alta District was inaugurated, in a game against "Team X" from Barcelona, later known as RCD Espanyol; in 1912, in the same site, the first game under floodlights was played in the country.

In 1933–34, the club won its first major trophy, the Catalan Football Championship, which allowed the winner to participate in the Copa del Presidente de la República. During the former tournament, it won 15 games and drew once, reaching the latter's final in the following season, losing 0–3 to Sevilla FC at the Chamartín Stadium.

Sabadell first competed in La Liga in the 1943–44 season, finishing ninth. It improved to fifth in 1946–47, ranking in front of Real Madrid and only four points behind champions Valencia CF, just one season after returning from Segunda División.

In 1968–69, Sabadell, guided by manager Pasieguito, finished a best-ever fourth as the top flight already consisted of 16 clubs. Subsequently, it competed in the Inter-Cities Fairs Cup, losing to Club Brugge K.V. of Belgium in the first round (3–5 on aggregate); in 1972, a seven-year ran in the top division came to an end, as the Arlequinats were relegated after finishing dead last.

CE Sabadell became a public limited sports company in 1991, being relegated to Segunda División B two years later, and immediately to Tercera División following severe economic problems. The club spent the following seventeen years in the third level (with the exception of 2006–07 in the fourth).
 
In the 2010–11 season, Sabadell, managed by Lluís Carreras, won its group in the regular season. In the playoffs, the team drew both games against SD Eibar, but was eventually promoted on the away goals rule following the 1–1 score at the Ipurua Municipal Stadium, returning to the professional divisions after 18 years.

Sabadell struggled in their return to the second level finishing in 19th place, being the first side in the relegation zone. However, they were spared when Villarreal CF dropped down a division in the top flight, which led to the automatic relegation of its reserve team Villarreal CF B. Sabadell finished second level as 16th in 2012–13 season, as 10th in the 2013–14 season. Finally Sabadell finished it as 21st and relegated to third level after 4 years.

Sabadell had a lot of financial problems after the relegation to Segunda B. Japanese owner Keisuke Sakamoto, who had bought the club in 2012, sold it to Aragón-based company Viacron in 2015. Esteve Calzada, a former member of FC Barcelona board and a marketing expert whose company worked for Manchester City, bought the club in 2017. Since then, the club's debt has been restructured. Difficulties in finding a new investor meant that from 2017 to 2019 the club was more concerned with relegation avoidance than real hopes of promotion.

In August 2019, the Club announced an historical agreement with a group of international investors, whereby this Group would achieve majority ownership through periodic capital infusions over the following three years to guarantee institutional stability and financial resources to achieve sustainable success.

On 26 July 2020, the Club secured promotion to the La Liga Smartbank Segunda División by beating Barcelona B 2-1 in the Segunda División B playoff final after five-years in third division. 

The team was immediately relegated in the following 2020–21 season by the narrow margin of one point, and joined the newly-created 1a RFEF Division.

In 2021-22 Season, the team did not manage to make it to Playoffs by the margin of a single point.

Season to season

14 seasons in La Liga
44 seasons in Segunda División
2 seasons in Primera División RFEF
23 seasons in Segunda División B
8 seasons in Tercera División

European record

 1R = first round

Players

Current squad

Youth players

Honours
Copa del Rey
Runners-up: 1935 
Quarter-finals: 1964–65, 1969–70, 1985–86, 1987–88

Campeonato de España
Winners: 1913

Championat de Catalunya
Winners: 1933–34

Copa Catalunya
Winners: 2015–16

Copa Federación de España
Winners: 1999–2000

Catalan Second Division
Winners: 1912–13, 1913–14, 1929–30

Segunda División
Winners: 1942–43, 1945–46

Segunda División B
Winners: 1983–84, 2010–11

Tercera División
Winners: 1931–32, 1963–64, 1976–77, 1993–94

Historic position in La Liga: 30th

Former players

Most appearances in La Liga
 Pepe Martinez: 151
 Isidro Sánchez: 142
 Ramón Montesinos: 142
 Ramón Marañón: 140
 Mario Pini: 138
 Josep Palau: 115
 Joaquín Navarro: 103
 Lluís Múñoz: 100
 Antonio Vázquez: 92
 Alberto Arnal: 86
 Manuel Pallas: 85
 Ricard Pujol: 81

Most goals in La Liga
 Antonio Vázquez: 35
 Manuel Pallas: 27
 Josep Palau: 26
 Antonio Sangrador: 23
 Juan del Pino: 24
 José Luis Garzón Sr.: 21
 Josep Antoni Noya: 15
 Josep María Vall: 15
 Ramón Marañon: 15
 Juli Gonzalvo : 14
 Benjamín Telechea: 12
 Periko Alonso: 12

Former coaches

Former presidents
 Joan Grau (1906–1910)
 Felip Davi (1910–1911)
 Joan Saus (1911–1923)
 Emili Moragas (1923–1929)
 Valentí Gorina (1929–1930)
 Antoni Tamburini (1930–1933)
 Josep Maria Marcet (1933–1934)
 Josep Bofarull (1934–1935)
 Josep Maria Marcet (1935–1939)
 Antoni Tamburini (1939)
 Josep Maria Marcet (1939–1942)
 Pau Maria Llonch (1945–1946)
 Miquel Sala (1946–1949)
 Pau Maria Llonch (1949–1951)
 Josep Maria Marcet (1951–1952)
 Pere Fontanet (1952)
 Josep Maria Marcet (1952–1953)
 Joan Ricart (1953–1955)
 Ricard Rosson (1955–1958)
 Antoni Altarriba (1958–1961)
 Ramiro Fernández (1961–1963)
 Josep Bargalló (1963)
 Antoni Llonch (1963–1965)
 Ricard Rosson (1965–1973)
 Francesc Marlasca (1973–1974)
 Joaquim Hors (1974–1975)
 Francesc Valldeperas (1975–1983)
 Rafael Arroyos (1983–1987)
 Alfred Besonias (1987–1991)
 Josep Miquel Sanmiquel (1991)
 Rafael Arroyos (1991–1993)
 Francesc Soldevilla (1993–1994)
 Joan Soteras (1994–1996)
 Eugeni Sánchez (1996)
 Joan Puig (1996)
 Miquel Arroyos (1996–2002)
 Francisco González Cano (2002–2004)
 Josep Manel Piedrafita (2004–2005)
 Antonio Larrosa (2005–2006)
 Joan Soteras (2006–2013)
 Keisuke Sakamoto (2013–2015)
 Antoni Reguant (2015–2018)
 Esteve calzada (2018-)

Stadium
Sabadell plays home games at Estadi de la Nova Creu Alta. Inaugurated on 20 August 1967 with a 1–0 win against FC Barcelona, it has a capacity of 11,908 spectators.

Supporters
The club has multiple supporter groups. Most groups have activities related to the social life of the members. For example, THE WALKING ARLEKIN CLUB has walking excursions during the season, usually before matches. There are also groups like Honor 1903, La Força Arlequinada and Supporters Gol Nord, that focus more on the encouragement of the team, before, during and after the matches. Most of those groups usually concentrate in the northern stand at the Nova Creu Alta.

The club used to have a fan club called Hooligans Vallès. They used to be a far right-wing group which was established in 1993. In 2011, the group was disbanded as an official supporter group. In 2014, two fans were expelled from the Nova Creu Alta, after performing a Nazi salute during a match. However, in 2016, an unofficial Hebrew supporter group was created, under the name CE Sabadell Hebreu - סבאדל בעברית. The group provides news about the club in its Facebook and Twitter pages, for Israeli and other Hebrew-speaking fans.

The fans have good relations with Bristol Rovers, which initially began due to several Rovers fans noticing that the local club had the same colours. They also have a friendship with Gerunda Sud of Girona FC, and rivalries with Desperdicis of UE Sant Andreu, Penya Sport of Palamos CF and Rudes Lleida of Lleida Esportiu.

Anthem
The official anthem of the club is Honor al Sabadell, written by Lluís Papell to the music of Adolf Cabané. However, between 1983 and 1991 the club used Sempre endavant Sabadell as the official anthem, composed by Ramon Montlleó.

References

External links

Official club store
Futbolme team profile 
BDFutbol team profile
Unofficial website 
Arlekinats, fansite 
CE Sabadell Hebreu (in Hebrew)

 
Football clubs in Catalonia
Association football clubs established in 1903
1903 establishments in Spain
1903 establishments in Catalonia
Segunda División clubs
La Liga clubs
Primera Federación clubs
Sabadell